Bealsmill is a hamlet in east Cornwall, England, UK. It is in the valley of the River Inny and is five miles (8 km) south-southeast of Launceston. It is in the civil parish of Stoke Climsland.

References

External links

Hamlets in Cornwall